Manurewa Intermediate School is a large multicultural school, located in central Manurewa, a suburb of Auckland's Manukau City, New Zealand.

History 
Manurewa Intermediate School started in 1961 and was officially opened in 1962.
The school won the Prime Minister's Education Excellence Awards in the Leadership Team category in 2017.

Culture 
The school draws from a large range of cultural and socio-economic backgrounds. This has led to the formation of several cultural groups within the school.

The Music Technology complex was opened in October 2000 by The Prime Minister of New Zealand Helen Clark.

Manurewa Intermediate also has a Morning Live school News, called MITV. It has useful information for students at the school (for example: fitness, meetings, and trips). It is hosted and mainly run by students of the school.

Notable alumni 
 Stephen Berry (born 1983), politician and political commentator

Notes

Intermediate schools in Auckland
Educational institutions established in 1961
1961 establishments in New Zealand